Patrícia Lopes (born 11 July 1982) is a Portuguese athlete who specialises in the 400 metres and 400 metres hurdles. She won the silver medal in the latter at the 2001 European Junior Championships.

Competition record

Personal bests
Outdoor
200 metres – 25.14 (+0.1 m/s) (Leiria 2007)
400 metres – 55.33 (Izmir 2005)
400 metres hurdles – 56.78 (Barcelona 2010)
Indoor
400 metres – 54.04 (Turin 2009)

References

1982 births
Living people
Portuguese female sprinters
Portuguese female hurdlers
Competitors at the 2005 Summer Universiade
Competitors at the 2007 Summer Universiade